Keen Kutter® is an American privately-owned trademark of premium hardware, cutlery and outfitter goods for outdoor enthusiasts. The company, based in Hoffman Estates, Illinois, designs, distributes and sells its products via company-owned catalogs and the Keen Kutter website as well as through authorized dealers in the United States. The trademark is owned by Val-Test® Group President, Russell Meeks who also owns Diamond Edge®.

History
Edward Campbell Simmons (E.C. Simmons) completed the first prototype to satisfaction in 1867. Without any premeditation, he wrote in pencil on the fresh pine wooden axe: Keen Kutter. At first, Keen Kutter referred to a particular kind of axe whose ultra-thin blade worked best on soft woods. By 1880, the Simmons Hardware Company applied the name to all of the company’s top-of-the-line cutting tools including axes, hatchets, saws, knives, scythes, adzes, bill hooks, shears, scissors, files, stones & razors. By 1900, the Keen Kutter catalogue included every conceivable type of tool & hardware item needed by carpenters, mechanics, gardeners, farmers & handymen of any discipline.

Merging with the Shapleigh Hardware Company in 1940, the Keen Kutter catalog achieved remarkable success through innovative campaigns designed to simplify the job of the retailer & satisfy the customer. The Shapleigh Hardware Company became one of the most extensive corporations of its kind with divisions in Wichita, Sioux City, Ogden, Toledo, New York, Minneapolis & St. Louis. By the turn of the century, the Keen Kutter warehouse space occupied over 1.5 million square feet & its pocket-knife plant in New York was the largest in the United States.

Today, the Keen Kutter trademark is owned by the Val-Test® Hardware Group of Illinois. After Val-Test® acquired the trademark, limited use authorization was developed for a premiere line of Keen Kutter pocket-knives manufactured by Schrade Cutlery, Frost Cutlery and most recently Bear & Son Cutlery Co. to remain committed to the finest quality made in the United States.

Collectible Interest 
Items bearing the Keen Kutter trademark are considered highly collectible.

Jerry and Elaine Heuring, authors of Collector's Guide To Keen Kutter, have thousands of items from their private collection, identified and described in detail and evaluated from axes, braces, and bits, to calendars, pocket knives, razors, rules etc., all in alphabetical order for quick identification. Their special section dedicated to tool reproductions and fakes will certainly protect the collector from making bad purchases. In addition to the standard line of tools and utensils, there are hundreds of colorful, whimsical store displays, advertisements, and other unusual items all made by Keen Kutter considered highly collectible.

The Hardware Companies Kollector's Klub founded in 1995 is another great source of information for Keen Kutter collectors.

References

Related links 
The Hardware Companies Kollector's Klub

Trademarks
Companies based in St. Louis